Stella Lake is a glacial tarn in the Snake Range of White Pine County, Nevada, United States. It is located within Great Basin National Park, just north of Wheeler Peak.  It is a prominent feature along the park's Alpine Lakes Loop Trail.

Stella, Teresa, Brown, Baker, Johnson, and Dead lakes are tarns. These glacial lakes are significant to the park’s ecosystem and their water quality is monitored on an annual basis.

References 

Lakes of Nevada
Lakes of White Pine County, Nevada
Lakes of the Great Basin
Great Basin National Park